Karl Delorme (23 January 1920 – 12 March 2011) was a German politician of the Social Democratic Party (SPD) and member of the German Bundestag.

Life 
Delorme was a member of the German Bundestag for one term from 29 March 1983 to 18 February 1987. He was elected via the state list of the SPD Rhineland-Palatinate.

Literature

References

1920 births
2011 deaths
Members of the Bundestag for Rhineland-Palatinate
Members of the Bundestag 1983–1987
Members of the Bundestag for the Social Democratic Party of Germany